Advances in Public Interest Accounting is a book series on accounting, published regularly since 1986.  The series is edited by Dr. Jorge Romero and published by Emerald Group Publishing.

The publication is abstracted and indexed in Scopus, Web of Science and Australian Business Deans Council.

References

Accounting books
Series of books
Emerald Group Publishing academic journals